St Chrysostom's Church may refer to:

 St Chrysostom's Church, Victoria Park, Manchester, England
 St Chrysostom's Church, Hockley, Birmingham, England